Welenga is the debut album by Wes Madiko and Michel Sanchez, released in 1996 through Saint George Records. The album reached the top 10 in Portugal.

Track listing
"Awa Awa" – 4:28
"Alane" – 3:39
"Kekana" – 3:17
"Wezale" – 4:39
"Ken Mouka" – 3:43
"Mawaza" – 4:47
"Mindoulou" – 4:12
"Mizobiya" – 4:54
"Degue Wegue" – 3:35
"Ramende" – 4:03
"Woukase" – 4:26
"Welenga" – 5:05

1998 release bonus tracks
"We Don't Need No War" – 3:50
"Midiwa Bol (I Love Football)" – 4:40
All songs by Madiko/Sanchez except tracks 13 (Madiko/Laurnea) and 14 (Madiko/Amaraggi).

Personnel
Wes Madiko
Michel Sanchez
Laurnea
Tony Amaraggi

Charts

Weekly charts

Year-end charts

References

Wes Madiko albums
1996 debut albums